Olearia humilis is a species of flowering plant in the family Asteraceae and is endemic to the south-west of Western Australia. It is an erect, spindly shrub with narrowly egg-shaped or linear leaves, and purple and yellow, daisy-like inflorescences.

Description
Its stems and leaves are covered with scattered thread-like and glandular hairs. Flowering occurs from July to November and the fruit is a flattened, light brown achene, the pappus with 21 to 33 bristles.

Taxonomy
Olearia humilis was first formally described in 1989 by Nicholas Sèan Lander in the journal Nuytsia from specimens collected by Philip Sydney Short, near the Sandstone-Paynes Find road in 1986. The specific epithet (humilis) means "low" or "small", referring to the statue of this species.

Distribution and habitat
Olearia humilis grows in shrubland and woodland in the Avon Wheatbelt, Coolgardie, Great Victoria Desert,  Murchison and Yalgoo  biogeographic regions of south-western Western Australia.

Conservation status
This daisy bush is listed as "not threatened" by the Department of Biodiversity, Conservation and Attractions.

References

humilis
Flora of Western Australia
Plants described in 1989